Lygaeus reclivatus is a species of seed bug in the family Lygaeidae. It is found in Central America and North America.

Subspecies
These two subspecies belong to the species Lygaeus reclivatus:
 Lygaeus reclivatus enotus Say, 1831
 Lygaeus reclivatus reclivatus Say, 1825

References

Further reading

 

Lygaeidae
Articles created by Qbugbot
Insects described in 1825